Simian Mobile Disco EP is the first EP by the British electronic band Simian Mobile Disco. It was released on 24 July 2007 on Interscope Records.

History
This EP was released in the United States as Clock EP in 2008 with a slightly different track listing. Its main purpose was to present Simian Mobile Disco to an American audience, which is why the first track was changed to "Clock" rather than "Tits & Acid".

The release of this EP was followed then by Attack Decay Sustain Release on 11 September 2007.

Track listing
All tracks written by J. Shaw and J. Ford.

 "Tits & Acid" – 4:04
 "Simple" – 5:56
 "3 Pin Din" – 5:01
 "State of Things" – 4:59

2007 EPs
Simian Mobile Disco albums
Albums produced by James Ford (musician)